Yonis Abdirizak Farah (born 4 September 1999) is a professional footballer who plays as a left back. Born in England, he represents the Somalia national team.

Club career
Farah played youth football for English club Southend United, before being released in May 2018. In 2019, Farah signed for Norwegian club Trysil FK. Ahead of the 2020 season, Farah joined Swedish Division 2 side Ytterhogdals, making his debut on 28 June against Piteå.

On 28 July 2021, Farah returned to Sweden to join Division 2 side Eskilstuna City.

International career
On 5 September 2019, Farah made his debut for Somalia in a 1–0 win against Zimbabwe, marking Somalia's first ever FIFA World Cup qualification victory.

Personal life
Farah has been described as a cousin of Olympic gold medallist Mo Farah. Yonis Farah's father, Abdirizak, is currently chairman of Somali First Division club Elman.

References

External links

Swedish league stats

1999 births
Living people
Association football fullbacks
Association football midfielders
People with acquired Somali citizenship
Somalian footballers
Somalia international footballers
Somalian expatriate footballers
Somalian expatriate sportspeople in Norway
Expatriate footballers in Norway
English footballers
Footballers from Greater London
Black British sportspeople
English sportspeople of African descent
English people of Somali descent
English expatriate footballers
English expatriate sportspeople in Norway